HMS Reclaim was a deep diving and submarine rescue vessel of the British Royal Navy. She was originally intended to be the King Salvor-class ocean salvage vessel Salverdant and was fitted with specialised equipment including underwater television cameras and sonar and echosounding apparatus. She was also equipped for submarine rescue work.

At the time of her commissioning in 1949, Reclaim was the Royal Navy's only vessel capable of carrying out deep diving operations. Upon completion Reclaim was attached to HMS Vernon, Portsmouth as a diving tender.

Operational service
 1951: on 14 June 1951 Reclaim found the submerged wreck of the submarine , missing since 17 April, during which operation her new underwater television apparatus was used. One of the divers from Reclaim working on the Affray was Lionel "Buster" Crabb, who later became famous when in 1956 he disappeared in Portsmouth harbour.
 1953: Attended the Coronation Fleet Review at Spithead.

From January and May 1961 she carried out diving trials in the Canary Isles. She was later relieved as Mine Counter Measures Support Ship by the minelayer , which enabled her to concentrate on her roles as deep diving support vessel.
 1968: Reclaim took part in the salvage operation on the Air Lingus Viscount 803 Aircraft EI-AOM, the "Saint Phelim", which had crashed into the Irish Sea off Tuskar Rock on 24 March 1968. Unfortunately, when Reclaim attempted to raise the fuselage to the surface using straps instead of nets, the wreckage broke apart upon reaching the surface and sank.
1974: Reclaim despatched to Harstad in Norway in May to recover a ditched Wessex helicopter from HMS Hermes. The Wessex was only located when Reclaim, using its underwater camera capability snagged the helicopter with the camera. A largely successful operation was spoiled when the gearbox and engine pulled out of the body of the aircraft.
 1977: Reclaim attended the 1977 Silver Jubilee Fleet Review off Spithead. Reclaim was the only ship to attend both the Coronation and Silver Jubilee reviews.
 1979: Reclaim (at that time the oldest ship in the Navy), was paid off, to be replaced by the new Seabed Operations Vessel .
 15 May 1982 arrived at Bruges, Belgium for demolition.

Trivia
HMS Reclaim served as a filming location for the Doctor Who serial "The Sea Devils" in 1971.

It was the last British warship to have sails. Although rarely used, they could add half a knot to her speed.

References

External links
 Photograph of HMS Reclaim

1948 ships
King Salvor-class salvage vessels of the Royal Navy